The second season of the long-running Australian medical drama All Saints began airing on 9 February 1999 and concluded on 23 November 1999 with a total of 43 episodes.

Cast

Main 
 Georgie Parker as Terri Sullivan
 Jeremy Cumpston as Connor Costello
 Judith McGrath as Von Ryan
 Libby Tanner as Bronwyn Craig
 Ben Tari as Jared Levine
 Kirrily White as Stephanie Markham
 Martin Lynes as Luke Forlano (41 episodes)
 Erik Thomson as Mitch Stevens (episodes 4–43)
 Sam Healy as Jaz Hillerman (10 episodes, up to episode 11)
 Andrew McKaige as Peter Morrison (9 episodes, up to episode 12)

Recurring 
 Brian Vriends as Ben Markham (39 episodes)
 Justine Clarke as Samantha O'Hara (13 episodes)
 Jake Blundell as Tony Hurst (13 episodes)
 Celia Ireland as Regina Butcher (12 episodes)
 Joy Smithers as Rose Carlton (4 episodes)
 Ling-Hsueh Tang as Kylie Preece (4 episodes)
 Elizabeth Maywald as Sophie Williams (2 episodes)

Guest 
 Kim Hilas as Joan Marden (6 episodes) 
 Peter Lamb as Neil Phillips (7 episodes)
 James Roden as Dr. Stan Ridgeway (5 episodes)
 Alexandra Fowler as Juliette McAllister (3 episodes)
 Terry Serio as Greg Costello (3 episodes)
 Pippa Grandison as Simone Carlisle (3 episodes)
 Melissa Jaffer as Eileen Sullivan (3 episodes)
 Martin Vaughan as Ryan Sullivan (2 episodes)
 Henri Szeps as George Bresnic (2 episodes)
 Bill Hunter as Ron Williams (2 episodes)
 Kristian Schmid as Thomas Ferry (2 episodes)
 Myles Pollard as Robert Ford (2 episodes)
 Grant Bowler as Darren Rigg (2 episodes)
 Kath Gordon as Astrid Langley (1 episode)
 Andy Anderson as Alan Mitchell (1 episode)
 Monroe Reimers as Ashok Patel (1 episode)
 Rhondda Findleton as Sharon Ellison (1 episode)
 Lois Ramsey as Thelma Franklin (1 episode)
 Andrea Moor as Alana Devlin (1 episode)
 Betty Bobbitt as Olivia Macreadie (1 episode)
 Gosia Dobrowlska as Lillian Gehler (1 episode)
 Tina Bursill as Margaret Evans (1 episode)
 Aaron Blabey as Scott Lacey (1 episode)
 Rebecca Smart as Charlie Wilde (1 episode)
 Carole Skinner as Sandra Gillespie (1 episode)
 Eric Bana as Rob Biletsky (1 episode)
 Stephen O'Connor as Julian Ridgeway (1 episode)

Episodes

DVD release

References

External links 
 
 List of All Saints season 2 episodes at the Australian Television Information Archive

All Saints (TV series) seasons
1999 Australian television seasons